Varsinais-Suomi (also known as Finland Proper or Southwest Finland) is one of the 13 electoral districts of the Parliament of Finland, the national legislature of Finland. The district was established as Turku and Pori South in 1907 when the Diet of Finland was replaced by the Parliament of Finland. It was renamed Varsinais-Suomi in 1999. It is conterminous with the region of Southwest Finland. The district currently elects 17 of the 200 members of the Parliament of Finland using the open party-list proportional representation electoral system. At the 2019 parliamentary election it had 394,180 registered electors.

History
Turku and Pori South was one 16 electoral districts established by the Election Act of the Grand Duchy of Finland (Suomen Suuriruhtinaanmaan Vaalilaki) passed by the Diet of Finland in 1906. It consisted of the hundreds (kihlakunta) of Åland, Halikko, Masku, Mynämäki, Piikkiö and Vehmaa in the province of Turku and Pori. The Åland region was separated into its own electoral district in 1947. At the same time, the town of Loimaa and the municipalities of Alastaro, Loimaa, Mellilä and Metsämaa were transferred from Turku North to Turku South. Somero municipality was transferred from Häme South to Turku South in 1990. The district was renamed Varsinais-Suomi in 1997. Kodisjoki municipality was transferred from Varsinais-Suomi to Satakunta in 1998.

Electoral system
Varsinais-Suomi currently elects 17 of the 200 members of the Parliament of Finland using the open party-list proportional representation electoral system. Parties may form electoral alliances with each other to pool their votes and increase their chances of winning seats. However. the number of candidates nominated by an electoral alliance may not exceed the maximum number of candidates that a single party may nominate. Seats are allocated using the D'Hondt method.

Election results

Summary

(Figures in italics represent joint lists.)

Detailed

2010s

2019
Results of the 2019 parliamentary election held on 14 April 2019:

The following candidates were elected:
Li Andersson (Vas), 24,542 votes; Sandra Bergqvist (SFP), 2,983 votes; Ritva Elomaa (PS), 7,688 votes; Eeva-Johanna Eloranta (SDP), 7,358 votes; Vilhelm Junnila (PS), 10,788 votes; Ilkka Kanerva (Kok), 7,350 votes; Esko Kiviranta (Kesk), 3,828 votes; Aki Lindén (SDP), 8,970 votes; Mikko Lundén (PS), 4,500 votes; Petteri Orpo (Kok), 10,792 votes; Annika Saarikko (Kesk), 9,390 votes; Saara-Sofia Sirén (Kok), 4,553 votes; Katja Taimela (SDP), 5,736 votes; Ville Tavio (PS), 14,957 votes; Anne-Mari Virolainen (Kok), 7,218 votes; Sofia Virta (Vihr), 4,289 votes; and Johannes Yrttiaho (Vas), 2,636 votes.

2015
Results of the 2015 parliamentary election held on 19 April 2015:

The following candidates were elected:
Olavi Ala-Nissilä (Kesk), 4,908 votes; Li Andersson (Vas), 15,071 votes; Ritva Elomaa (PS), 9,571 votes; 9,571 votes; Eeva-Johanna Eloranta (SDP), 6,689 votes; Ilkka Kanerva (Kok), 9,183 votes; Ilkka Kantola (SDP), 5,908 votes; Esko Kiviranta (Kesk), 5,994 votes; Annika Lapintie (Vas), 5,027 votes; Maria Lohela (PS), 5,583 votes; Ville Niinistö (Vihr), 8,835 votes; Petteri Orpo (Kok), 10,652 votes; Annika Saarikko (Kesk), 10,510 votes; Saara-Sofia Sirén (Kok), 4,625 votes; Katja Taimela (SDP), 6,017 votes; Ville Tavio (PS), 6,847 votes; Anne-Mari Virolainen (Kok), 7,169 votes; and Stefan Wallin (SFP), 9,787 votes.

2011
Results of the 2011 parliamentary election held on 17 April 2011:

The following candidates were elected:
Ritva Elomaa (PS), 13,121 votes; Eeva-Johanna Eloranta (SDP), 3,648 votes; Lauri Heikkilä (PS), 6,199 votes; Pertti Hemmilä (Kok), 6,413 votes; Ilkka Kanerva (Kok), 7,820 votes; Ilkka Kantola (SDP), 6,339 votes; Esko Kiviranta (Kesk), 6,035 votes; Annika Lapintie (Vas), 7,723 votes; Maria Lohela (PS), 4,873 votes; Ville Niinistö (Vihr), 5,362 votes; Petteri Orpo (Kok), 11,018 votes; Heli Paasio (SDP), 13,958 votes; Annika Saarikko (Kesk), 4,185 votes; Katja Taimela (SDP), 8,498 votes; Anne-Mari Virolainen (Kok), 10,041 votes; Stefan Wallin (SFP), 12,366 votes; and Jyrki Yrttiaho (Vas), 4,634 votes.

2000s

2007
Results of the 2007 parliamentary election held on 18 March 2007:

The following candidates were elected:
Janina Andersson (Vihr), 5,587 votes; Pertti Hemmilä (Kok), 6,188 votes; Liisa Hyssälä (Kesk), 6,152 votes; Ilkka Kanerva (Kok), 11,079 votes; Ilkka Kantola (SDP), 5,091 votes; Timo Kaunisto (Kesk), 7,213 votes; Esko Kiviranta (Kesk), 6,210 votes; Marjaana Koskinen (SDP), 7,649 votes; Annika Lapintie (Vas), 5,575 votes; Jouko Laxell (Kok), 5,056 votes; Ville Niinistö (Vihr), 5,182 votes; Petteri Orpo (Kok), 6,069 votes; Heli Paasio (SDP), 11,233 votes; Katja Taimela (SDP), 5,984 votes; Anne-Mari Virolainen (Kok), 6,812 votes; Stefan Wallin (SFP), 12,097 votes; and Jyrki Yrttiaho (Vas), 4,492 votes.

2003
Results of the 2003 parliamentary election held on 16 March 2003:

The following candidates were elected:
Olavi Ala-Nissilä (Kesk), 7,381 votes; Janina Andersson (Vihr), 6,625 votes; Jan-Erik Enestam (SFP), 6,450 votes; Sari Essayah (KD), 9,597 votes; Pertti Hemmilä (Kok), 6,473 votes; Liisa Hyssälä (Kesk), 8,869 votes; Mikko Immonen (Vas), 3,939 votes; Ville Itälä (Kok), 21,422 votes; Ilkka Kanerva (Kok), 7,203 votes; Marjukka Karttunen (Kok), 4,377 votes; Esko Kiviranta (Kesk), 6,758 votes; Marjaana Koskinen (SDP), 9,367 votes; Annika Lapintie (Vas), 6,743 votes; Heli Paasio (SDP), 12,651 votes; Maija Perho (Kok), 4,991 votes; Virpa Puisto (SDP), 7,485 votes; and Jukka Roos (SDP), 6,088 votes.

1990s

1999
Results of the 1999 parliamentary election held on 21 March 1999:

The following candidates were elected:
Olavi Ala-Nissilä (Kesk), 6,895 votes; Janina Andersson (Vihr), 9,172 votes; Jan-Erik Enestam (SFP), 9,010 votes; Pertti Hemmilä (Kok), 6,190 votes; Liisa Hyssälä (Kesk), 7,111 votes; Mikko Immonen (Vas), 4,463 votes; Ville Itälä (Kok), 14,130 votes; Ilkka Kanerva (Kok), 8,843 votes; Marjukka Karttunen-Raiskio (Kok), 4,943 votes; Marjaana Koskinen (SDP), 7,874 votes; Annika Lapintie (Vas), 8,299 votes; Jukka Mikkola (SDP), 5,722 votes; Heli Paasio (SDP), 7,175 votes; Maija Perho (Kok), 6,370 votes; Virpa Puisto (SDP), 6,890 votes; Mauri Salo (Kesk), 6,248 votes; and Ismo Seivästö (SKL).

1995
Results of the 1995 parliamentary election held on 19 March 1995:

The following candidates were elected:
Olavi Ala-Nissilä (Kesk), 8,329 votes; Janina Andersson (Vihr), 5,244 votes; Jan-Erik Enestam (SFP), 8,462 votes; Liisa Hyssälä (Kesk), 5,838 votes; Mikko Immonen (Vas), 7,486 votes; Ville Itälä (Kok), 6,108 votes; Timo Järvilahti (Kesk), 6,596 votes; Marjut Kaarilahti (Kok), 3,243 votes; Ilkka Kanerva (Kok), 6,685 votes; Marjaana Koskinen (SDP), 5,153 votes; Annika Lapintie (Vas), 11,677 votes; Jukka Mikkola (SDP), 6,160 votes; Sauli Niinistö (Kok), 18,946 votes; Pertti Paasio (SDP), 14,606 votes; Maija Perho (Kok), 8,805 votes; Virpa Puisto (SDP), 7,136 votes; and Jukka Roos (SDP), 7,393 votes.

1991
Results of the 1991 parliamentary election held on 17 March 1991:

The following candidates were elected:
Olavi Ala-Nissilä (Kesk), 4,729 votes; Heli Astala (Vas), 5,363 votes; Jan-Erik Enestam (SFP), 10,480 votes; Timo Järvilahti (Kesk), 7,190 votes; Marjut Kaarilahti (Kok), 4,788 votes; Ilkka Kanerva (Kok), 11,660 votes; Eeva Kuuskoski (Kesk), 21,743 votes; Ensio Laine (Vas), 7,067 votes; Jarmo Laivoranta (Kesk), 5,876 votes; Sauli Niinistö (Kok), 6,216 votes; Pertti Paasio (SDP), 9,851 votes; Maija Perho (Kok), 6,585 votes; Virpa Puisto (SDP), 6,593 votes; Mikko Rönnholm (SDP), 4,783 votes; Jukka Roos (SDP), 8,444 votes; Ismo Seivästö (SKL), 4,704 votes; and Hannu Suhonen (SMP), 4,417 votes.

1980s

1987
Results of the 1987 parliamentary election held on 15 and 16 March 1987:

The following candidates were elected:
Risto Ahonen (SDP), 5,531 votes; Heli Astala (SKDL), 6,850 votes; Sauli Hautala (SKL), 4,198 votes; Liisa Hilpelä (Kok), 7,400 votes; Tapio Holvitie (Kok), 5,869 votes; Anna-Liisa Jokinen (SKDL), 2,683 votes; Ilkka Kanerva (Kok), 10,772 votes; Eeva Kuuskoski (Kesk), 15,672 votes; Ensio Laine (DEVA), 7,067 votes; Sauli Niinistö (Kok), 6,976 votes; Pertti Paasio (SDP), 8,044 votes; Heikki Perho (Kok), 7,071 votes; Virpa Puisto (SDP), 5,935 votes; Jukka Roos (SDP), 5,422 votes; Taisto Tähkämaa (Kesk), 4,153 votes; Christoffer Taxell (SFP), 14,006 votes; and Pekka Vennamo (SMP), 12,638 votes.

1983
Results of the 1983 parliamentary election held on 20 and 21 March 1983:

The following candidates were elected:
Risto Ahonen (SDP), 5,490 votes; Heli Astala (SKDL), 6,470 votes; Paula Eenilä (SDP), 6,641 votees; Liisa Hilpelä (Kok), 7,249 votes; Tapio Holvitie (Kok), 8,036 votes; Anna-Liisa Jokinen (SKDL), 4,156 votes; Ilkka Kanerva (Kok), 5,893 votes; Eeva Kuuskoski (Kesk-LKP), 5,991 votes; Ensio Laine (SKDL), 9,023 votes; Jukka Mikkola (SDP), 5,603 votes; Pertti Paasio (SDP), 8,520 votes; Heikki Perho (Kok), 7,291 votes; Martti Ratu (SMP), 3,110 votes; Mikko Rönnholm (SDP), 6,571 votes; Taisto Tähkämaa (Kesk-LKP), 7,860 votes; Christoffer Taxell (SFP), 12,357 votes; and Pekka Vennamo (SMP), 25,088 votes.

1970s

1979
Results of the 1979 parliamentary election held on 18 and 19 March 1979:

The following candidates were elected:
Heli Astala (SKDL), 9,692 votes; Reino Breilin (SDP), 5,828 votes; Paula Eenilä (SDP), 10,904 votees; Sauli Hautala (SKL), 7,115 votes; Tapio Holvitie (Kok), 8,168 votes; Anna-Liisa Jokinen (SKDL), 7,332 votes; Ilkka Kanerva (Kok), 7,993 votes; Eeva Kuuskoski (Kok), 9,141 votes; Ensio Laine (SKDL), 7,904 votes; Arto Lampinen (Kok), 7,026 votes; Lauri Palmunen (Kesk), 8,022 votes; Heikki Perho (Kok), 6,202 votes; Mikko Rönnholm (SDP), 5,740 votes; Jacob Söderman (SDP), 7,643 votes; Taisto Tähkämaa (Kesk), 7,147 votes; Christoffer Taxell (SFP), 10,303 votes; and Pekka Vennamo (SMP), 12,657 votes.

1975
Results of the 1975 parliamentary election held on 21 and 22 September 1975:

The following candidates were elected:
Paavo Aitio (SKDL), 9,398 votes; Reino Breilin (SDP), 7,745 votes; Paula Eenilä (SDP), 8,692 votees; Sauli Hautala (SKL), 7,452 votes; Anna-Liisa Jokinen (SKDL), 9,735 votes; Ilkka Kanerva (Kok), 8,921 votes; Ensio Laine (SKDL), 7,488 votes; Arto Lampinen (Kok), 9,699 votes; Arto Merisaari (SKDL), 11,910 votes; Pertti Paasio (SDP), 7,021 votes; Heikki Perho (Kok), 5,757 votes; Jacob Söderman (SDP), 5,536 votes; V. J. Sukselainen (Kesk), 6,779 votes; Taisto Tähkämaa (Kesk), 7,062 votes; Christoffer Taxell (SFP), 10,349 votes; and Irma Toivanen (LKP), 10,280 votes.

1972
Results of the 1972 parliamentary election held on 2 and 3 January 1972:

The following candidates were elected:
Paavo Aitio (SKDL), 13,531 votes; Reino Breilin (SDP), 7,487 votes; Anna-Liisa Jokinen (SKDL), 7,650 votes; Mauno Kurppa (SMP), 5,587 votes; Olavi Lähteenmäki (Kok), 5,460 votes; Ensio Laine (SKDL), 6,881 votes; Esko Niskanen (SDP), 6,076 votes; Rafael Paasio (SDP), 9,368 votes; Arvo Sainio (SMP), 4,683 votes; Sylvi Siltanen (SDP), 9,967 votes; V. J. Sukselainen (Kesk), 5,501 votes; Taisto Tähkämaa (Kesk), 7,734 votes; Carl Olof Tallgren (SFP), 11,357 votes; Irma Toivanen (LKP), 4,570 votes; Tauno Vartia (Kok), 5,262 votes; and Juha Vikatmaa (Kok), 14,115 votes.

1970
Results of the 1970 parliamentary election held on 15 and 16 March 1970:

The following candidates were elected:
Paavo Aitio (SKDL), 12,164 votes; Reino Breilin (SDP), 5,879 votes; Anna-Liisa Jokinen (SKDL), 5,691 votes; Katri Kaarlonen (Kesk), 6,293 votes; Mauno Kurppa (SMP), 4,281 votes; Olavi Lähteenmäki (Kok), 8,351 votes; Ensio Laine (SKDL), 5,498 votes; Esko Niskanen (SDP), 5,286 votes; Rafael Paasio (SDP), 6,898 votes; Sylvi Siltanen (SDP), 9,712 votes; Oili Suomi (SKDL), 3,631 votes; Taisto Tähkämaa (Kesk), 4,844 votes; Carl Olof Tallgren (SFP), 11,687 votes; Irma Toivanen (LKP), 2,111 votes; Tauno Vartia (Kok), 5,138 votes; and Juha Vikatmaa (Kok), 11,324 votes.

1960s

1966
Results of the 1966 parliamentary election held on 20 and 21 March 1966:

The following candidates were elected:
Paavo Aitio (SKDL), 13,790 votes; Reino Breilin (SDP), 6,654 votes; Vappu Heinonen (TPSL), 4,529 votes; Voitto Hellsten (SDP), 5,943 votes; Mauno Jussila (Kesk), 6,692 votes; Katri Kaarlonen (Kesk), 5,299 votes; Irma Karvikko (LKP), 5,491 votes; Olavi Lähteenmäki (Kok), 5,244 votes; Aimo Laiho (SKDL), 3,593 votes; Esko Niskanen (SDP), 6,667 votes; Rafael Paasio (SDP), 10,342 votes; Pekka Silander (SKDL), 5,059 votes; Sylvi Siltanen (SDP), 8,899 votes; V. J. Sukselainen (Kesk), 5,515 votes; Carl Olof Tallgren (SFP), 7,132 votes; and Tauno Vartia (Kok), 4,695 votes.

1962
Results of the 1962 parliamentary election held on 4 and 5 February 1962:

The following candidates were elected:
Paavo Aitio (SKDL), 14,904 votes; Voitto Hellsten (SDP), 4,965 votes; Mauno Jussila (ML), 8,306 votes; Urho Kähönen (ML), 6,878 votes; Irma Karvikko (SK), 9,115 votes; Harras Kyttä (SK), 9,944 votes; Olavi Lähteenmäki (Kok), 8,843 votes; Aimo Laiho (SKDL), 3,466 votes; Per Laurén (SFP), 6,060 votes; Judit Nederström-Lundén (SKDL), 6,768 votes; Rafael Paasio (SDP), 8,458 votes; Kalervo Saura (Kok), 5,111 votes; Sylvi Siltanen (SDP), 7,267 votes; V. J. Sukselainen (ML), 10,078 votes; Carl Olof Tallgren (SFP), 6,890 votes; and Inkeri Virtanen (SKDL), 3,547 votes.

1950s

1958
Results of the 1958 parliamentary election held on 6 and 7 July 1958:

The following candidates were elected:
Aimo Aaltonen (SKDL), 4,719 votes; Paavo Aitio (SKDL), 7,475 votes; Vappu Heinonen (SDP), 4,588 votes; Mauno Jussila (ML), 5,622 votes; Urho Kähönen (ML), 5,223 votes; Urho Kulovaara (SDP), 4,440 votes; Harras Kyttä (SK), 5,284 votes; Olavi Lähteenmäki (Kok), 5,265 votes; Judit Nederström-Lundén (SKDL), 7,292 votes; Rafael Paasio (SDP), 5,768 votes; Eino Roine (SKDL), 4,145 votes; Kalervo Saura (Kok), 4,858 votes; Sylvi Siltanen (SDP), 5,038 votes; V. J. Sukselainen (ML), 7,644 votes; Ralf Törngren (SFP), 6,505 votes; and Impi Virtanen (SKDL), 2,892 votes.

1954
Results of the 1954 parliamentary election held on 7 and 8 March 1954:

The following candidates were elected:
Aimo Aaltonen (SKDL); Paavo Aitio (SKDL); Vappu Heinonen (SDP); Niilo Honkala (Kok); Kalle Jokinen (SDP); Mauno Jussila (ML); Urho Kähönen (ML); Irma Karvikko (SK); Urho Kulovaara (SDP); Harras Kyttä (SK); Judit Nederström-Lundén (SKDL); Rafael Paasio (SDP); Eino Roine (SKDL); Kalervo Saura (Kok); V. J. Sukselainen (ML); and Ralf Törngren (SFP).

1951
Results of the 1951 parliamentary election held on 1 and 2 July 1951:

The following candidates were elected:
Aimo Aaltonen (SKDL); Paavo Aitio (SKDL); Vappu Heinonen (SDP); Ture Hollstén (SFP); Niilo Honkala (Kok); Kalle Jokinen (SDP); Mauno Jussila (ML); Urho Kähönen (ML); Irma Karvikko (SK); Urho Kulovaara (SDP); Harras Kyttä (SK); Judit Nederström-Lundén (SKDL); Anna Nevalainen (SKDL); Rafael Paasio (SDP); Kalervo Saura (Kok); V. J. Sukselainen (ML); and Ralf Törngren (SFP).

1940s

1948
Results of the 1948 parliamentary election held on 1 and 2 July 1948:

The following candidates were elected:
Aimo Aaltonen (SKDL); Aarne Honka (Kok); Niilo Honkala (Kok); Kalle Jokinen (SDP); Irma Karvikko (KE); Urho Kulovaara (SDP); Aino Lehtokoski (SDP); Anna Nevalainen (SKDL); Rafael Paasio (SDP); Mauri Perkonoja (SKDL); Eino Roine (SKDL); Samuli Simula (ML); V. J. Sukselainen (ML); and Ralf Törngren (SFP).

1945
Results of the 1945 parliamentary election held on 17 and 18 March 1945:

The following candidates were elected:
Aimo Aaltonen (SKDL); Ture Hollstén (SFP); Niilo Honkala (Kok); Kalle Jokinen (SDP); Jalmari Kulmala (SKDL); Urho Kulovaara (SDP); Aino Lehtokoski (SDP); Leo Leppä (Kok); Vihtori Metsäranta (SKDL); Anna Nevalainen (SKDL); Juho Pilppula (ML); Eino Roine (SKDL); Samuli Simula (ML); Yrjö Suontausta (KE); and Ralf Törngren (SFP).

1930s

1939
Results of the 1939 parliamentary election held on 1 and 2 July 1939:

The following candidates were elected:
Mikko Erich (SDP); Einar Holmberg (SFP); Aarne Honka (Kok); Hugo Johansson (SFP); Kalle Jokinen (SDP); Einari Karvetti (ML); Arvo Ketonen (KE); Aku Korvenoja (Kok); Urho Kulovaara (SDP); Aino Lehtokoski (SDP); Gottfrid Lindström (SDP); Kustaa Perho (SDP); Juho Pilppula (ML); Yrjö Saarinen (IKL); and Ralf Törngren (SFP).

1936
Results of the 1936 parliamentary election held on 1 and 2 July 1936:

The following candidates were elected:
Rafael Colliander (SFP); Yrjö Helenius (SDP); Aarne Honka (Kok); Emil Jokinen (SDP); Kalle Jokinen (SDP); Einari Karvetti (ML); Edvard Kilpeläinen (Kok); Toivo Mikael Kivimäki (KE); Urho Kulovaara (SDP); Karl Laurén (SFP); Aino Lehtokoski (SDP); Gottfrid Lindström (SDP); Kustaa Perho (SDP); Juho Pilppula (ML); Yrjö Saarinen (IKL); and Ralf Törngren (SFP).

1933
Results of the 1933 parliamentary election held on 1, 2 and 3 July 1933:

The following candidates were elected:
Aleksi Aaltonen (SDTP); Rafael Colliander (SFP); Aarne Honka (Kok-IKL); Emil Jokinen (SDTP); Kaarlo Kares (Kok-IKL); Einari Karvetti (ML); Aku Korvenoja (Kok-IKL); Urho Kulovaara (SDTP); Aino Lehtokoski (SDTP); Gottfrid Lindström (SDTP); Herman Mattsson (SFP); Kustaa Perho (SDTP); Juho Pilppula (ML); Johan Sjöblom (SFP); Urho Toivola (KE); and Toivo Tyrni (KE).

1930
Results of the 1930 parliamentary election held on 1 and 2 October 1930:

The following candidates were elected:
Aleksi Aaltonen (SDTP); Emil Jokinen (SDTP); Alli Kallioniemi (Kok); Juho Kaskinen (KE); Edvard Kilpeläinen (Kok); Toivo Mikael Kivimäki (KE); Urho Kulovaara (SDTP); Aino Lehtokoski (SDTP); Erkki Perheentupa (Kok); Kustaa Perho (SDTP); Juho Pilppula (ML); Emil Roos (SFP); Torsten Rothberg (SFP); Paavo Saarinen (ML); Gunnar Sahlstein (Kok); and Emil Sarlin  (SFP).

1920s

1929
Results of the 1929 parliamentary election held on 1 and 2 July 1929:

The following candidates were elected:
Aleksi Aaltonen (SDTP); Rafael Colliander (SFP); Anders Forsberg (SFP); Verner Halén (STPV); Bernhard Heikkilä (Kok); Emil Jokinen (SDTP); Edvard Kilpeläinen (Kok); Toivo Mikael Kivimäki (KE); Kalle Kulmala (STPV); Karl Laurén (SFP); Aino Lehtokoski (SDTP); Knut Molin (SFP); Kustaa Perho (SDTP); Juho Pilppula (ML); Paavo Saarinen (ML); and Gunnar Sahlstein (Kok).

1927
Results of the 1927 parliamentary election held on 1 and 2 July 1927:

The following candidates were elected:
Ernesti Aarnio (Kok); Rafael Colliander (SFP); Anders Forsberg (SFP); Bernhard Heikkilä (Kok); Emil Jokinen (SDTP); Berndt Kullberg (SFP); Kalle Kulmala (STPV); Jaakko Latvala (SDTP); Aino Lehtokoski (SDTP); Jussi Leino (SDTP); Knut Molin (SFP); Juho Pilppula (ML); Emanuel Ramstedt (STPV); Risto Ryti (KE); Paavo Saarinen (ML); and Gunnar Sahlstein (Kok).

1924
Results of the 1924 parliamentary election held on 1 and 2 April 1924:

The following candidates were elected:
Amos Anderson (SFP); Valentin Annala (SDTP); Waldemar Bergroth (Kok); Anders Forsberg (SFP); Bernhard Heikkilä (Kok); Toivo Mikael Kivimäki (KE); Kalle Kulmala (STPV); Karl Laurén (SFP); Aino Lehtokoski (SDTP); Jussi Leino (SDTP); Knut Molin (SFP); Emanuel Ramstedt (STPV); Juho Rannikko (Kok); Paavo Saarinen (ML); Eino Tulenheimo (Kok); and Wäinö Wuolijoki (SDTP).

1922
Results of the 1922 parliamentary election held on 1, 2 and 3 July 1922:

The following candidates were elected:
Amos Anderson (SFP); Waldemar Bergroth (Kok); Rafael Colliander (SFP); Väinö Hannula (SSTP); Antti Kaarne (SSTP); Väinö Kivilinna (ML); Jaakko Latvala (SDTP); Aino Lehtokoski (SDTP); Heikki Mäkinen (SSTP); Laura Numminen (SSTP); Johannes Nyberg (Kok); Antti Penttilä (KE); Juho Rannikko (Kok); Wilhelm Roos (SFP); Eino Tulenheimo (Kok); and Wäinö Wuolijoki (SDTP).

1910s

1919
Results of the 1919 parliamentary election held on 1, 2 and 3 March 1919:

The following candidates were elected:
Rafael Colliander (SFP); Matti Helenius-Seppälä (KrTL); Johan Helo (SDTP); Karl Holma (Kok); Juho Kaskinen (KE); Arvi Kontu (KE); Karl Laurén (SFP); Mooses Lehtinen (SDTP); Aino Lehtokoski (SDTP); Väinö Lehtonen  (SDTP); Eliel Mickelsson (SDTP); Ernst Nevanlinna (Kok); Johannes Nyberg (Kok); Heikki Ritavuori (KE); Sikstus Rönnberg (SDTP); and Wilhelm Roos (SFP).

1917
Results of the 1917 parliamentary election held on 1 and 2 October 1917:

The following candidates were elected:
Valentin Annala (SDP); Waldemar Bergroth (SP-NP-KP); Rafael Colliander (SFP); Evert Eloranta (SDP); Erkki Härmä (SDP); Seth Heikkilä (SDP); Jaakko Latvala (SDP); Antti Mikkola (SP-NP-KP); Ernst Nevanlinna (SP-NP-KP); Onni Rantasalo (SP-NP-KP); Wilhelm Roos (SFP); Emil Schybergson (SFP); Julius Sundblom (SFP); Elviira Vihersalo (SDP); Karl Wiik (SDP); and Iida Yrjö-Koskinen (SP-NP-KP).

1916
Results of the 1916 parliamentary election held on 1 and 3 July 1916:

The following candidates were elected:
Ida Aalle-Teljo (SDP); Jenny af Forselles (SFP); Juho Aitamurto (SP); Valentin Annala (SDP); Evert Eloranta (SDP); Matti Helenius-Seppälä (KrTL); William Isaksson (SFP); Juho Kaskinen (NP); Jaakko Latvala (SDP); Konrad Lehtimäki (SDP); Ernst Nevanlinna (SP); Kaarle Raade (SP); Wilhelm Roos (SFP); Julius Sundblom (SFP); Elviira Vihersalo (SDP); Karl Wiik (SDP); and Iida Yrjö-Koskinen (SP).

1913
Results of the 1913 parliamentary election held on 1 and 2 August 1913:

The following candidates were elected:
Ida Aalle-Teljo (SDP); Jenny af Forselles (SFP); Valentin Annala (SDP); Evert Eloranta (SDP); John Hedberg (SFP); William Isaksson (SFP); Juho Kaskinen (NP); Edvard Kilpeläinen (SP); Konrad Lehtimäki (SDP); Ludvig Lindström (SDP); Juho Rannikko (SP); Heikki Ritavuori (NP); Wilhelm Roos (SFP); Allan Serlachius (SP); Julius Sundblom (SFP); Elviira Vihersalo (SDP); and Iida Yrjö-Koskinen (SP).

1911
Results of the 1911 parliamentary election held on 2 and 3 January 1911:

The following candidates were elected:
Ida Aalle-Teljo (SDP); Jenny af Forselles (SFP); Valentin Annala (SDP); Evert Eloranta (SDP); John Hedberg (SFP); Matti Helenius-Seppälä (KrTL); Pietari Kärnä (SP); Juho Kaskinen (NP); Kaarle Knuutila (SP); Jaakko Latvala (SDP); Juho Rannikko (SP); Wilhelm Roos (SFP); Wilho Sipilä (SP); Julius Sundblom (SFP); Taavi Tainio (SDP); Viktor Magnus von Born (SFP); and Iida Yrjö-Koskinen (SP).

1910
Results of the 1910 parliamentary election held on 1 and 2 February 1910:

The following candidates were elected:
Ida Aalle-Teljo (SDP); Jenny af Forselles (SFP); Valentin Annala (SDP); Evert Eloranta (SDP); John Hedberg (SFP); Matti Helenius-Seppälä (KrTL); Pietari Kärnä (SP); Juho Kaskinen (NP); Kaarle Knuutila (SP); Jaakko Latvala (SDP); Juho Rannikko (SP); Wilhelm Roos (SFP); Wilho Sipilä (SP); Julius Sundblom (SFP); Taavi Tainio (SDP); Viktor Magnus von Born (SFP); and Iida Yrjö-Koskinen (SP).

1900s

1909
Results of the 1909 parliamentary election held on 1 and 3 May 1909:

The following candidates were elected:
Ida Aalle-Teljo (SDP); Juho Aitamurto (SP); Valentin Annala (SDP); Rafael Colliander (SFP); Evert Eloranta (SDP); John Hedberg (SFP); Valde Hirvikanta (SP); Aleksi Käpy (SP); Juho Kaskinen (NP); Antti Mikkola (NP); Santeri Nuorteva (SDP); Juho Rannikko (SP); Wilhelm Roos (SFP); Wilho Sipilä (SP); Fredrik Stenström (SFP); Julius Sundblom (SFP); and Wäinö Wuolijoki (SDP).

1908
Results of the 1908 parliamentary election held on 1 and 2 July 1908:

The following candidates were elected:
Ida Aalle-Teljo (SDP); Juho Aitamurto (SP); Evert Eloranta (SDP); Alexandra Gripenberg (SP); John Hedberg (SFP); Seth Heikkilä (SDP); Matti Helenius-Seppälä (KrTL); August Hjelt (SP); Aleksi Käpy (SP); Juho Kaskinen (NP); Dagmar Neovius (SFP); Juho Rannikko (SP); Vilhelm Rosenqvist (SFP); Albert Stigzelius (SFP); Julius Sundblom (SFP); Taavi Tainio (SDP); and Wäinö Wuolijoki (SDP).

1907
Results of the 1907 parliamentary election held on 15 and 16 March 1907:

The following candidates were elected:
Ida Aalle-Teljo (SDP); Alexandra Gripenberg (SP); Seth Heikkilä (SDP); Kaarlo Heininen (KrTL); August Hjelt (SP); Aleksi Käpy (SP); Karl Julian Karlsson (SFP); Kaarle Knuutila (SP); Antti Mikkola (NP); Dagmar Neovius (SFP); Juho Rannikko (SP); Vilhelm Rosenqvist (SFP); Oskar Schultz (SFP); Wilho Sipilä (SP); Julius Sundblom (SFP); Taavi Tainio (SDP); and Wäinö Wuolijoki (SDP).

Notes

References

1907 establishments in Finland
Constituencies established in 1907
Parliament of Finland electoral districts
parliamentary electoral district